Chad Edward Gaudin (born March 24, 1983) is a former American professional baseball pitcher. He has been used as both a starting pitcher and a reliever throughout his career, functioning as a  "swingman."

Gaudin has pitched in Major League Baseball (MLB) for the Tampa Bay Devil Rays, Toronto Blue Jays, Oakland Athletics, Chicago Cubs, San Diego Padres, New York Yankees, Washington Nationals, Miami Marlins, and San Francisco Giants.

High school
Gaudin attended Crescent City Baptist High School in Metairie, Louisiana. He earned All-State and district MVP in his junior and senior years.

Professional career

Tampa Bay Devil Rays

Minor leagues
Gaudin was selected by the Tampa Bay Devil Rays out of high school in the 34th round (1009th overall pick) of the 2001 Major League Baseball Draft. He signed on August 23, 2001, and did not play professionally until 2002. He played in Single-A in 2002 and recorded a 2.26 ERA which ranked him 10th in all of minor league baseball.

On July 15, 2003, in his first start after getting called up from the Single-A California League, Gaudin took the mound in the first game of a doubleheader for the Double-A Orlando Rays on the road against the Jacksonville Suns and threw a 7-inning perfect game, retiring all 21 batters he faced. (Two 7-inning games is the standard for a doubleheader in most minor leagues; Major League Baseball would later amend a rule recognizing only efforts of at least nine innings as official perfect games.) Gaudin made only two more starts and posted an 0.47 ERA for Orlando before Devil Rays' Manager Lou Piniella summoned him to the big league club.

Major leagues
When Gaudin made his major league debut, he became the youngest Devil Ray in club history at 20 years and four months and was the 4th youngest player in the majors. He allowed one run in 2.1 innings in his debut on August 1, 2003, against the Kansas City Royals.  After posting a very respectable 2–0 record and 3.60 ERA in 15 appearances (including 3 starts) in 2003 for the Devil Rays, he went 1–2 with a 4.85 ERA in 26 appearances (4 starts) in 2004 while splitting time with the Triple-A Durham Bulls.

Toronto Blue Jays
On December 12, 2004, Gaudin was traded to the Toronto Blue Jays for backup catcher Kevin Cash. Although he pitched well as a starter at Triple-A Syracuse, he was just 1–3 with a 13.15 ERA in 5 appearances (3 starts) with the Blue Jays. Opponents had batted .470 against him in just 13 innings (31 hits).

Oakland Athletics
On December 5, 2005, he was traded to the Oakland Athletics for a player to be named later, who later turned out to be outfielder Dustin Majewski.

Gaudin began the 2006 season for the Sacramento River Cats, the Athletics Triple-A team. He was recalled by the Athletics after posting an 0.36 ERA in 4 starts for the River Cats and pitched in relief for the rest of the season for the big league club. In his first season as an Athletic, he posted various career highs and his ERA (3.08) and opponents batting average were the lowest of his career. His inherited runners to score was 20 percent, which ranked fourth lowest in the American League.

In 2007, Gaudin was converted into a starter again when veteran Esteban Loaiza was on the disabled list to begin the season. He pitched in a team high and career high 34 starts, posting career highs in wins (11), innings pitched (199.1), strikeouts (154) and walks (100). His excellent performance as a starter in the 2007 season made him part of the new 'Big Three' that included Dan Haren and Joe Blanton.

In December 2007, Gaudin successfully had his sesamoid bone removed from the base of his big toe in a procedure called a sesamoidectomy. He was back on the mound pitching again within three months.

Gauding began the 2008 season in the rotation, appearing in 6 starts. On May 7, 2008, Gaudin was moved back into the bullpen. He went 5-3 in 26 games along with 6 starts for the A's before being traded.

Chicago Cubs

On July 8, 2008, Gaudin was dealt along with Rich Harden to the Chicago Cubs in exchange for Sean Gallagher, Matt Murton, Eric Patterson, and minor league catcher Josh Donaldson.

Despite posting a 4-2 record, Gaudin pitched poorly for the Cubs, posting an ERA over 6.00 after coming over from Oakland. Gaudin was released by the Cubs on April 5, 2009 after a disappointing second half.

San Diego Padres

The San Diego Padres signed him to a minor league contract on April 12, 2009 and assigned him to their Triple-A team, the Portland Beavers on April 14. He made his first start for the Padres against the Colorado Rockies on April 28. He gave up zero runs on 3 hits and received a no decision in a 4–3 Padres win.

Through 19 starts and 1 relief appearance, Gaudin was 4-10 with an ERA of 5.13. In 105.1 innings pitched, he had 105 strikeouts while also issuing 56 walks in the process.

New York Yankees
On August 6, 2009, Gaudin was traded to the New York Yankees for a player to be named later, but instead the Padres took $100,000.  With the Yankees, Gaudin filled a valuable role as a spot starter and relief pitcher, making six starts (all of which the Yankees won) and five relief appearances, recording a 3.43 ERA. He got his first championship ring after the Yankees won the 2009 World Series against the Philadelphia Phillies.

Gaudin was released by the Yankees on March 25, 2010.

Return to Oakland
On March 28, 2010, Gaudin signed a major league deal with the Oakland Athletics. He was designated for assignment on May 17 and released on May 21. In 12 games, he had an 8.83 ERA for the Athletics.

Return to New York
On May 26, 2010 Gaudin was re-signed by the Yankees. He pitched in 30 games with a 1-2 record and a 4.50 ERA. On November 2, 2010 Gaudin was outrighted to the minor leagues and elected free agency.

Washington Nationals

On December 17, Gaudin signed a minor-league contract with the Washington Nationals. He made 10 appearances for the Nationals, recording 6.48 ERA in  innings before being designated for assignment on July 19, 2011. He was released on July 21.

Toronto Blue Jays
Gaudin signed a minor league contract with the Toronto Blue Jays on August 5. He was 2-3 with a 6.14 ERA for the AAA Las Vegas 51s.

Miami Marlins

On January 4, 2012, Gaudin signed a minor league contract with the Miami Marlins. The next day, he received an invitation to spring training by the Marlins. Gaudin was used as a long reliever. He finished the year with 69.1 innings pitched, a 4.54 ERA, a 1.41 WHIP, and 57 strikeouts.

San Francisco Giants
Gaudin signed a minor league deal with the San Francisco Giants on December 13, 2012. On March 26, 2013, it was reported that Gaudin had his contract purchased and had been added to the Major League roster as the final piece of the bullpen. The San Jose Mercury News reported that "Gaudin will be the long man and a swing man of sorts, capable of pitching several innings at a time or even spot-starting."

Gaudin pitched out of the bullpen most of the season, while also making 12 starts for the Giants. His record finished at 5-2 and a 3.06 ERA, the lowest of his career. He struck out 88 batters in 97 innings.

Philadelphia Phillies
Gaudin signed a minor league deal with the Philadelphia Phillies on January 21, 2014. The Phillies released him on February 13 when he failed a physical.

Los Angeles Dodgers
On February 25, 2015, Gaudin signed a minor league contract with the Los Angeles Dodgers. He battled a recurring bout of nerve irritation during spring training and did not make the club, instead he was shut down for a period to recover. He wound up undergoing carpal tunnel release surgery and spent the entire season rehabbing in Arizona.

Pericos de Puebla
On April 1, 2016, Gaudin signed with the Pericos de Puebla of the Mexican Baseball League (LMB).  As the closer he saved 33 games in 36 opportunities and then added 7 more saves in the playoffs - including the final game - as the Pericos won their first LMB Championship in 31 seasons.  He was also named to the LMB All-Star team.  He finished the year with a record of 2-0 with a 1.64 earned run average while striking out 48 batters and walking only 13 in 44 innings pitched.

Acereros de Monclova
On February 21, 2017, Gaudin, along with Daric Barton, Manny Rodriguez, Nyjer Morgan, Rodolfo Amador, and Willy Taveras were traded to the Acereros de Monclova in exchange for RHP Joaquín Lara. He was released on April 14, 2018.

Leones de Yucatán
On April 23, 2018, Gaudin signed with the Leones de Yucatán of the Mexican Baseball League.
He also pitches for Charros de Jalisco in the Liga del Pacifico along with Sergio Romo. He was released on January 11, 2020.

Pitching style
Gaudin works with four pitches. His main one is a four-seam fastball at 90–93 mph. He also has a two-seamer at 89–92, a slider at 79–82, and a changeup at 86–89. His slider is mainly used against right-handed hitters (especially with 2 strikes), while his changeup is used almost exclusively against lefties.

Personal life
Gaudin is married to Syndal Gorden since January 29, 2011.  The couple appeared on an episode of House Hunters.

Syndal chose her wedding gown on an episode of Say Yes to the Dress entitled The Group Calls It.  She was accompanied to Kleinfeld's by Yankee wives Amber (Mrs. C.C.) Sabathia and Karen (Mrs. A.J.) Burnett and a friend, Tara Neal, who picked her dress for her.  When the episode was aired, Gaudin was with the Nationals.

Gaudin learned how to throw a slider in Little League, when a coach showed him the curveball grip.

In July 2013, it was reported that Gaudin had been charged with lewdness stemming from an incident in January. While in the emergency room of Desert Springs Hospital, it was alleged that Gaudin groped a woman while she was lying on a gurney. In September he pleaded no contest to a reduced charge of disorderly conduct and was sentenced to 100 hours of community service and impulse control counselling.

References

External links

Pelota Binaria (Venezuelan Winter League)

1983 births
Living people
Acereros de Monclova players
American expatriate baseball players in Canada
American expatriate baseball players in Mexico
Bakersfield Blaze players
Baseball players from New Orleans
Cajun people
Charleston RiverDogs players
Chicago Cubs players
Durham Bulls players
Gigantes del Cibao players
American expatriate baseball players in the Dominican Republic
Hagerstown Suns players
Las Vegas 51s players
Leones de Yucatán players
Major League Baseball pitchers
Mexican League baseball pitchers
Miami Marlins players
Navegantes del Magallanes players
American expatriate baseball players in Venezuela
New York Yankees players
Oakland Athletics players
Orlando Rays players
People from Metairie, Louisiana
Pericos de Puebla players
Portland Beavers players
Potomac Nationals players
Sacramento River Cats players
San Diego Padres players
San Francisco Giants players
Syracuse Chiefs players
Syracuse SkyChiefs players
Tampa Bay Devil Rays players
Toronto Blue Jays players
Washington Nationals players
Tomateros de Culiacán players
Charros de Jalisco players